Moldova is scheduled to compete at the 2019 European Games, in Minsk, Belarus from 21 to 30 June 2019. Moldova has previously competed at the 2015 European Games in Baku, Azerbaijan, where it won 3 medals.

Archery

Recurve

Badminton

Boxing

Men

Women

Canoe sprint

Men

Women

Cycling

Road
Men

Judo

Men

Sambo

Men

Women

Shooting

Men

Table tennis

Wrestling

Men's freestyle

Men's Greco-Roman

Women's freestyle

References

Nations at the 2019 European Games
European Games
2019